Sir Alwyn Douglas Crow   (10 May 1894 – 5 February 1965) was a British scientist involved in research into ballistics, projectiles and missiles from 1916 to 1953. At Fort Halstead he developed the Unrotated Projectile an antiaircraft weapon for the Royal Navy,  used in the early period of World War II when the supply of anti-aircraft guns was limited. His obituary in The Times called him a Rocket Projectile Pioneer.

He was born in London, and educated at Queens' College, Cambridge. In World War I he was commissioned in the East Surrey Regiment, was injured in 1916, and Mentioned in Despatches.

In 1917, he was appointed to the staff of the Royal Arsenal, Woolwich. He was Director of Ballistics Research at Woolwich 1919–1939, Chief Superintendent of Projectile Development 1939-40, then Director and Controller of Projectile Development 1940-45, then Director of Guided Projectiles at the Ministry of Supply 1945–1946. He was in Washington, D.C. as Head of Technical Services to the British Joint Services Mission to Washington from 1946 to 1953. He retired in 1953, became a consultant and in 1960 settled in the United States with his second wife.

Honours
He was appointed an Officer of the Order of the British Empire in the 1918 Birthday Honours and made a Commander of the Order in the 1937 Coronation Honours. He was knighted in 1944.

References

Sources 
 Obituary A Rocket Projectile Pioneer in The Times, London of 6 February 1965 p.10.
 Who was Who 1965 (A&C Black, London)

1894 births
1965 deaths
British scientists
Rocket scientists
Alumni of Queens' College, Cambridge
Ballistics experts
Weapons scientists and engineers
British Army personnel of World War I
East Surrey Regiment officers
Commanders of the Order of the British Empire
Fellows of the Institute of Physics
Knights Bachelor